The  1972 New Orleans Saints season was the team's sixth as a member of the National Football League (NFL). They failed to improve on their previous season’s output of 4–8–2, winning only two games. The team failed to qualify for the playoffs for the sixth consecutive season.

The Saints suffered through their second 2–11–1 season in three years, tying with the Philadelphia Eagles for the second worst record in the league, only surpassed by the Houston Oilers’ 1–13. Coincidentally, one of the Saints' two wins came at the Eagles' expense. It would be their worst until they went 2–12 in 1975.

Offseason

NFL draft

Personnel

Staff

Roster

Schedule

Standings

Notable events
 In their third game against the 49ers, the Saints became the thirty-second NFL team, and the first since the 1970 Cleveland Browns, to score only a safety in a full game. This was done again in the last week of the regular season by the San Diego Chargers, but after that was done only by the 1980 Buffalo Bills, the 1983 Minnesota Vikings, the 1993 Cincinnati Bengals, 2011 Atlanta Falcons, and 2013 Jacksonville Jaguars.

References

New Orleans Saints seasons
New Orleans Saints
New Orleans Saints